The Department for Culture, Media and Sport (DCMS) is a department of His Majesty's Government, with responsibility for culture and sport in England, and some aspects of the media throughout the UK, such as broadcasting.

It also has responsibility for the tourism, leisure and creative industries (some joint with Department for Business and Trade). The department was also responsible for the delivery of the 2012 Olympic Games and Paralympic Games. The department also had responsibility for the building of a digital economy and the internet from 2017 to 2023.

Prior to the 2023 British cabinet reshuffle, the department was known as Department for Digital, Culture, Media and Sport.

History and responsibilities

DCMS originates from the Department of National Heritage (DNH), which itself was created on 11 April 1992 out of various other departments, soon after the Conservative election victory. The former ministers for the Arts and for Sport had previously been located in other departments.

DNH was renamed as the Department for Culture, Media and Sport (DCMS) on 14 July 1997, under the premiership of Tony Blair. It was renamed to Department for Digital, Culture, Media and Sport on 3 July 2017, staying DCMS under the premiership of Theresa May to reflect the department's increased activity in the digital sector. The department was renamed back to the Department for Culture, Media and Sport (DCMS) in February 2023, with responsibility for digital moving to the new Department for Science, Innovation and Technology.

2012 Olympics
DCMS was the co-ordinating department for the successful bid by London to host the 2012 Olympics and appointed and oversees the agencies delivering the Games' infrastructure and programme, principally the Olympic Delivery Authority (ODA) and LOCOG.

The June 2007 Cabinet reshuffle led to Tessa Jowell MP taking on the role of Paymaster General and then Minister for the Cabinet Office while remaining Minister for the Olympics.  Ministerial responsibility for the Olympics was shared with Ms Jowell in the Cabinet Office, but the staff of the Government Olympic Executive (GOE) remained based in DCMS.

2010–present
Following the 2010 general election, ministerial responsibility for the Olympics returned to the Secretary of State. Although Jeremy Hunt's full title was Secretary of State for Culture, Olympics, Media and Sport, the department's name remained unchanged. On 4 September 2012, Hunt was appointed Health Secretary in a cabinet reshuffle and replaced by Maria Miller. Maria Miller later resigned due to controversy over her expenses. Her replacement was announced later that day as Sajid Javid.

After the 2015 general election, John Whittingdale was appointed as Secretary of State, tasked with initiating the BBC Charter review process. DCMS received full responsibility for the digital economy policy, formerly jointly held with BIS, and sponsorship of the Information Commissioner's Office from the Ministry of Justice.

Whittingdale was replaced by Karen Bradley after the referendum on the UK's membership of the EU in July 2016.  The Office for Civil Society moved from the Cabinet Office to DCMS as part of the same reshuffle.

In January 2018, Matthew Hancock, previous Minister of State for Digital, was appointed Secretary of State as part of a Cabinet reshuffle. In the 9 July 2018 reshuffle, Jeremy Wright became the Secretary of State. Nicky Morgan became Secretary of State in July 2019; she stood down as an MP at the 2019 United Kingdom general election but was ennobled as Baroness Morgan of Cotes and retained her position from within the House of Lords. As part of the 13 February 2020 reshuffle, Oliver Dowden MP was appointed Secretary of State for Digital, Culture, Media and Sport.

Policy areas
It is responsible for government policy in the following areas:
 The arts
 Broadcasting, including the BBC
 Civil society
 Charities
 Creative industries
 Advertising
 Arts market
 Design
 Fashion
 Film
 Music industry
 Publishing
 Historic environment
 Architecture and design
 Cultural property and heritage
 Entertainment licensing
 Gambling and racing
 Press freedom and regulation
 Libraries
 Museums and galleries
 The National Lottery
 Tourism
 Sport
 Olympic legacy

Other responsibilities
Other responsibilities of DCMS include listing of historic buildings, scheduling of ancient monuments, export licensing of cultural goods, and management of the Government Art Collection (GAC).

The Secretary of State has responsibility for the maintenance of the land and buildings making up the historic Royal Estate under the Crown Lands Act 1851. These inherited functions, which were once centralised in the Office of Works, are now delivered as follows:

 The Royal Parks are maintained by an executive agency within DCMS, the Royal Parks Agency;
 The unoccupied royal palaces in England are managed by a contract with Historic Royal Palaces;
 Maintenance of the occupied royal palaces in England was funded by an annual grant-in-aid to the Royal Household until 31 March 2012.  The Secretary of State for Culture retains legal responsibility for these palaces, but from 1 April 2012 this funding was amalgamated with the Civil List into a single Sovereign Grant administered by HM Treasury.  DCMS continues to make a separate small grant to the Royal Household for the maintenance of Marlborough House

The department also has responsibility for state ceremonial occasions and royal funerals.  However, responsibility for the Civil List element of head-of-state expenditure and income from the separate Crown Estate remains with the Chancellor of the Exchequer.

DCMS works jointly with the Department for Business, Innovation and Skills (BIS) on design issues, including sponsorship of the Design Council, and on relations with the computer games and publishing industries.

DCMS organises the annual Remembrance Day Ceremony at the Cenotaph and has responsibility for providing humanitarian assistance in the event of a disaster. In the government's response to the 7 July 2005 London bombings the department coordinated humanitarian support to the relatives of victims and arranged the memorial events.

DCMS has also supported cyber initiatives such as Cyber Discovery and the UK Cyber Security Forum to support innovation in the cyber industry.

Headquarters
The main offices are at 100 Parliament Street, occupying part of the building known as Government Offices Great George Street.

Ministers
The DCMS ministers are as follows:

On 7 February 2023 it was announced that the Department's Permanent Secretary role would be performed on an interim basis by Ruth Hannant and Polly Payne (job share).

Bodies sponsored by DCMS

The DCMS has policy responsibility for three statutory corporations and two public broadcasting authorities. These bodies and their operation are largely independent of government policy influence.

Non-ministerial departments 
DCMS works with two non-ministerial departments:
 The National Archives
 Charity Commission for England and Wales

Statutory corporations
The statutory corporations are:
 Channel Four Television Corporation
 Historic Royal Palaces
 Office of Communications (Ofcom)

The department was responsible for the Horserace Totalisator Board (The Tote) until the sale of the Tote's business to Betfred in July 2011.

Public corporations
The public corporations are:
 British Broadcasting Corporation
 Sianel Pedwar Cymru – and the S4C Authority which regulates and manages S4C

Non-departmental public bodies
The DCMS sponsors the following executive non-departmental public bodies including a number of museums and galleries:
 Arts Council England
 British Film Institute
 British Library
 British Museum
 Equality and Human Rights Commission
 Gambling Commission
 Museum of the Home (formerly the Geffrye Museum)
 Historic England (separated from English Heritage in 2015, formally the Historic Buildings & Monuments Commission for England)
 Horniman Museum
 Horserace Betting Levy Board
 Imperial War Museum
 Information Commissioner's Office
 National Gallery
 National Heritage Memorial Fund (the Trustees of the NHMF also administer the Heritage Lottery Fund)
 National Maritime Museum
 National Museums Liverpool
 National Portrait Gallery
 Natural History Museum
 Royal Armouries
 Science Museum Group
 Sir John Soane's Museum
 Sport England (formally the English Sports Council)
 Sports Grounds Safety Authority
 Tate
 UK Anti-Doping
 UK Sport (formally the UK Sports Council)
 Victoria and Albert Museum
 VisitBritain (formally the British Tourist Authority)
 VisitEngland
 Wallace Collection

The DCMS sponsors the following advisory non-departmental public bodies:
 Reviewing Committee on the Export of Works of Art and Objects of Cultural Interest
 Theatres Trust
 Treasure Valuation Committee

DCMS also has responsibility for two other bodies classified by the Office for National Statistics as being within the central government sector:

 The London Organising Committee for the Olympic Games (LOCOG) is a company limited by guarantee, established by a joint venture agreement between the Secretary of State for Culture, Media and Sport, the Mayor of London and the British Olympic Association.
 Churches Conservation Trust

DCMS is also the major financial sponsor of the following bodies, which are not classed as part of the UK central government
 Chatham Historic Dockyard Trust
 Greenwich Foundation for the Old Royal Naval College for the Old Royal Naval College
 Tyne and Wear Museums

Sponsorship of the National Endowment for Science, Technology and the Arts (NESTA) transferred to the Department for Innovation, Universities and Skills in June 2007.  The Museum of London transferred to the Greater London Authority from 1 April 2008.

DCMS formerly sponsored eight Regional Cultural Consortiums with NDPB status.  In July 2008, DCMS announced that the consortiums would be phased out over a twelve-month period and replaced by a new alliance of the regional teams of Arts Council England, Sport England, English Heritage and the MLA.

Devolution

Culture, sport and tourism are devolved matters, with responsibility resting with corresponding departments in the Scottish Government in Scotland, the Welsh Government in Wales and the Northern Ireland Executive in Northern Ireland.

Media-related policy is generally reserved to Westminster i.e. not devolved.  These areas include:

Scotland

Reserved matters:
 Film classification
 Broadcasting
 Public lending right
 Entertainment licensing
 National Lottery
 Digital economy
 Telecommunications and broadband
 Internet
 press freedom and regulation
Scotland's comparability factor (the proportion of spending in this area devolved to the Scottish Government) was 68% for 2021/22.

Northern Ireland

Reserved matters:
 Broadcasting
 The National Lottery
 Digital economy
 Telecommunications and broadband
 Internet

The department's main counterparts in Northern Ireland are as follows:
 Department of Culture, Arts and Leisure (architecture, arts, culture, galleries, libraries, museums, sport)
 Department of the Environment (historic built environment)
 Department of Enterprise, Trade and Investment (tourism)
 Department for Social Development (gambling, liquor licensing)

Northern Ireland's comparability factor (the proportion of spending in this area devolved to the Northern Ireland Executive) was 69.9% for 2021/22.

Wales

Reserved matters:
 Film classification
 Broadcasting, BBC
 Public lending right
 Digital economy
 Entertainment licensing
 Betting, Gambling and Lotteries
 Telecommunications and broadband
 Internet
 press freedom and regulation
Wales' comparability factor (the proportion of spending in this area devolved to the Welsh Government) was 67.7% for 2021/22.

See also
 United Kingdom budget
 Digital Economy Act 2010
 Culture, Media and Sport Committee

References

External links

Video clips
 DCMS YouTube channel

 
Arts in England
English art
English culture
Mass media in the United Kingdom
Performing arts in England
Sports organisations of the United Kingdom
Sport in England
United Kingdom
Ministries established in 1992
Mass media in England
1992 establishments in the United Kingdom
Culture ministries
Tourism ministries